Casterton is a civil parish in the South Lakeland District of Cumbria, England. It contains 18 listed buildings that are recorded in the National Heritage List for England. Of these, one is listed at Grade I, the highest of the three grades, one is at Grade II*, the middle grade, and the others are at Grade II, the lowest grade.  The parish contains the village of Casterton and the surrounding countryside.  The listed buildings include country houses and associated structures, farmhouses and farm buildings, bridges, limekilns, a milestone, and a church.


Key

Buildings

References

Citations

Sources

Lists of listed buildings in Cumbria